Edith, Texas is a ghost town in Coke County, Texas, eight miles west of Robert Lee on Highway 158. The population never really grew much, as the estimated 25 residents had left by the 1970s.

References

Ghost towns in West Texas
Geography of Coke County, Texas